Nationality words link to articles with information on the nation's poetry or literature (for instance, Irish or France).

Events
 October 10 – Ezra Pound leaves Paris permanently and moves to Rapallo, Italy. He stays there briefly, moving on to Sicily (he will return to settle in Rapallo in January 1925).
 McGill Daily Literary Supplement started at McGill University in Montreal, Canada (ceases publication in 1925; followed by the McGill Fortnightly Review, 1925–1927) by A. J. M. Smith, F. R. Scott, Leon Edel, and later joined by A. M. Klein and Leo Kennedy. The periodical, which publishes poems and articles on contemporary trends, is the first in Canada to offer consistent commentary on modernist principles in poetry and literature.
 Daniel Corkery publishes the study of 18th century Irish poetry, The Hidden Ireland.

Works published

Australia
 Arthur Henry Adams, Fifty Nursery Rhymes with Music, Australian
 Edwin James Brady, The Land of the Sun
 C. J. Dennis, Rose of Spadgers
 Kenneth Slessor, Thief of the Moon, Sydney: Hand press of J. T. Kirtley, Australia

India in English
 Sri Aurobindo, Love and Death, Madras: Shama's Publishing House

United Kingdom
 Kenneth H. Ashley, Up Hill and Down Dale
 Roy Campbell, The Flaming Terrapin
 T. S. Eliot, Homage to John Dryden (criticism)
 From Overseas, verse from the British colonies; the first published anthology to include Caribbean poetry, with works by nine Jamaican poets included
 Aldous Huxley, Little Mexican, and Other Stories
 John Masefield, Sard Harker
 Susan Miles, The Hares
 A. A. Milne, When We Were Very Young, for children
 Edith Sitwell, The Sleeping Beauty
 A. H. Stockwell, editor, Eastern Dreams: a Selection of Verse, London; anthology; Indian poetry in English, published in the United Kingdom
 Humbert Wolfe, Kensington Gardens
 W. B. Yeats, The Cat and the Moon, and Certain Poems, drama and verse, Irish poet published in the United Kingdom

United States
 Hilda Conkling, Silverhorn
 Hilda Doolittle (H.D.), Heliodora and Other Poems
 William Faulkner, The Marble Faun
 Robinson Jeffers, Tamar and Other Poems
 William Ellery Leonard, Tutankhamen and After
 Archibald MacLeish, The Happy Marriage and Other Poems
 Edgar Lee Masters, The New Spoon River
 Marianne Moore, Observations
 James Oppenheim, The Sea
 John Crowe Ransom, Chills and Fever
 Mark Van Doren, Spring Thunder

Other in English
 A. H. Stockwell, editor, Eastern Dreams: a Selection of Verse, London; anthology; Indian poetry in English, published in the United Kingdom
 W. B. Yeats, The Cat and the Moon, and Certain Poems, drama and verse, Irish poet published in the United Kingdom

Works published in other languages

France
 Anthologie des écrivains morts à la guerre
 Robert Desnos, Deuil pour deuil
 Francis Jammes, Livres des quatrains, published each year from 1922 to 1925
 Jean-Joseph Rabearivelo, La coupe de cendres ("The Cup of Ashes"), Malagasy poet writing in French
 Pierre Reverdy, Les Épaves du ciel
 Saint-John Perse, pen name of Marie-René Alexis Saint-Léger:
 Amitié du prince, Paris: Ronald Davis
 Anabase, Paris: Gallimard (revised edition 1948)

Other languages
 Delmira Agustini, Obras completas ("Complete Works"): Volume 1, El rosario de Eros; Volume 2: Los astros del abismo, posthumously published (died 1914), Montevideo, Uruguay: Máximo García
 Hugo Ball, 7 schizophrene Sonette, German poet in Switzerland
 Villem Grünthal-Ridala, Toomas ja Mai, Estonia
 Sir Muhammad Iqbal, Bang-i-Dara (The Call Of The Marching Bell), the first philosophical poetry book the author writes and publishes in Urdu rather than Persian (translated into English by M.A.K. Khalil in 1996)
 Vladimir Mayakovsky, Vladimir Ilyich Lenin, Soviet Russia
 Gabriela Mistral, Ternura: canciones de niños, Madrid: Saturnino Calleja
 Pablo Neruda, Veinte poemas de amor y una canción desesperada (Twenty Love Poems and a Song of Despair), Chile
 Sergei Yesenin, Land of Scoundrels, Soviet RussiaAwards and honors
 Pulitzer Prize for Poetry: Robert Frost, New Hampshire: A Poem with Notes and Grace Notes''

Births
Death years link to the corresponding "[year] in poetry" article:
 February 8 – Lisel Mueller (died 2020), American poet
 March 2 – Edgar Bowers (died 2000) American poet
 March 5 – David Ferry, American poet and translator
 March 22 – Michael Hamburger (died 2007), British translator, poet, critic, memoirist and academic
 April 2 – Lauris Edmond (died 2000), New Zealand poet
 April 21 – P. Bhaskaran (died 2007), Indian, Malayalam-language poet and film songwriter
 May 3 – Yehuda Amichai יהודה עמיחי (died 2000), Israeli poet and one of the first to write in colloquial Hebrew
 May 7 – Marjorie Boulton (died 2017), English poet and literary critic writing also in Esperanto 
 May 12 – Claribel Alegría (died 2018), Nicaraguan novelist, poet and writer in Nicaragua and El Salvador
 June 7 – Edward Field, American poet and author
 June 29
 Cid Corman (died 2004), American poet, translator and editor
 John Haines (died 2011), American poet
 July 19 – Vassar Miller (died 1998), American poet
 August 22 – Ada Jafri (died 2015), Urdu poet
 August 28 – Janet Frame (died 2004) New Zealand poet, writer and novelist
 September 28 – James Berry (died 2017), Jamaican-born poet
 October 9 – Jane Cooper (died 2007), American poet
 October 20 – Robert Peters (died 2014), American poet, critic, scholar, playwright and editor
 October 29 – Zbigniew Herbert (died 1998), Polish poet, essayist, moralist and member of the Polish resistance during World War II; perhaps the most famous and most translated of Polish writers
 November 25 – Takaaki Yoshimoto 吉本隆明,  also known as "Ryūmei Yoshimoto" (died 2012), Japanese poet, literary critic and philosopher; father of the writer Banana Yoshimoto and cartoonist Haruno Yoiko (surname: Yoshimoto)
 November 28 – Dennis Brutus (died 2009), South African poet and anti-Apartheid activist, imprisoned in the cell next to Nelson Mandela's on Robben Island from 1963 to 1965; earns the Lifetime Honorary Award by the South African Department of Arts and Culture for lifelong dedication to African and world poetry and literary arts
 December 20 – Friederike Mayröcker, Austrian poet
 December 21 – Alphonse Allain (died 2022), French Norman language poet
 December 24 – Nissim Ezekiel (died 2004), Indian poet, playwright and art critic writing in English .
 Also:
 Elizabeth Bartlett (died 2008), English poet
 Matthew Mead (died 2009), English poet and editor

Deaths
Death years link to the corresponding "[year] in poetry" article:
 January 16 – Kumaran Asan, 50 (born 1873), Indian, Malayalam-language poet
 May 4 – Edith Nesbit, 65 (born 1858), English author and poet whose children's works were published under the name "E. Nesbit"
 July 19 – Kingsley Fairbridge, 39 (born 1885), South African editor of a poetry anthology and humanitarian
 August 25 – Velma Caldwell Melville, 66 (born 1858), American editor and writer
 December 8 – Bochō Yamamura 山村 暮鳥, 40 (born 1884), Japanese vagabond Christian preacher who gained attention as a writer of tales and songs for children and as a poet (surname: Bochō)
 December 15 – William Herbert Carruth, 65 (born 1859), American poet
 December 23 – Thomas William Hodgson Crosland, 59? (born 1865?), English poet

See also

 Poetry
 List of poetry awards
 List of years in poetry
 New Objectivity in German literature and art

Notes

20th-century poetry
Poetry